Wielka Wola may refer to the following places in Poland:
Wielka Wola, former village, now incorporated into Warsaw as the district of Wola
Wielka Wola, Opoczno County in Łódź Voivodeship (central Poland)
Wielka Wola, Tomaszów Mazowiecki County in Łódź Voivodeship (central Poland)